The Fenney Spring hydrobe. scientific name Aphaostracon xynoelictum, is a species of very small freshwater snails that have an operculum, aquatic operculate gastropod mollusks in the family Hydrobiidae.

Distribution
This species is endemic to the United States.  Its natural habitat is rivers. It is threatened by habitat loss.

References

 Bogan, A.E. 2000.  Aphaostracon xynoelictum.   2006 IUCN Red List of Threatened Species.   Downloaded on 6 August 2007.

Molluscs of the United States
Aphaostracon
Gastropods described in 1968
Taxonomy articles created by Polbot